Dragon Ball is the first of two anime adaptations of the Dragon Ball manga series by Akira Toriyama. Produced by Toei Animation, the anime series premiered in Japan on Fuji Television on February 26, 1986, and ran until April 19, 1989. Spanning 153 episodes it covers the first 194 chapters of the 519 chapter-long manga series. It is followed by Dragon Ball Z, which covers the remainder of the manga.

Sagas overview

Episode list

Season 1: Emperor Pilaf Saga (1986)

Season 2: Tournament Saga (1986)

Season 3: Red Ribbon Army Saga (1986–87)

Season 4: General Blue Saga (1987)

Season 5: Commander Red Saga (1987)

Season 6: Fortuneteller Baba Saga (1987)

Season 7: Tien Shinhan Saga (1987–88)

Season 8: King Piccolo Saga (1988)

Season 9: Piccolo Jr. Saga (1988–89)

See also
List of Dragon Ball films

Notes

References
General
 
  

 
Specific

Dragon Ball